Open Heart is a 2015 Canadian mystery-drama television series produced by the Epitome Pictures unit of DHX Media in association with marblemedia. It aired simultaneously on January 20, 2015 on YTV in Canada and TeenNick in the United States. In June 2015, Canada's ABC Spark acquired the rights to air reruns of the show.

Premise
Set in Downtown Toronto,  now on probation, 16 year old  Dylan Blake, the rebellious daughter of a fractured family of doctors, as she uses her probation stint as a youth hospital volunteer to secretly investigate the disappearance of her father, who went missing six months earlier,   

but while on her investigation, she discovers her family home skeletons in the closet that goes way deeper than her father's disappearance.

Cast

Main cast
 Karis Cameron as Dylan Blake, the main protagonist of the show who is determined to find her missing father.
 Justin Kelly as Wes Silver, a volunteer at Open Heart and Dylan's love interest.
 Cristine Prosperi as Mikayla Walker, a volunteer at Open Heart and a good friend of Dylan's.
 Tori Anderson as London Blake, a doctor at Open Heart and Dylan's sister.
 Jenny Cooper as Jane Blake, a doctor at Open Heart and Dylan and London's mother.

Recurring cast
 Jeffrey Douglas as Richard Blake, Dylan's missing father.
 Sasha Clements as Rayna Sherazi, one of Dylan's old friends from her "bling ring".
 Nahanni Johnstone as Veronica Rykov, the woman last seen with Dylan's father and is related to his disappearance.
 Elena Juatco as Scarlet McWhinnie, a doctor at Open Heart whose stunning beauty often leaves her razor sharp medical skills underestimated by others
 Kevin McGarry as Timothy "Hud" Hudson, a doctor at Open Heart and an ex-Army medic.
 Dylan Everett as Teddy Ralston, Dylan's ex-boyfriend from her "bling ring".
 Mena Massoud as Jared Malik, supervisor over the volunteers at Open Heart and Mikayla's love interest
 Patrick Kwok-Choon as Seth Park, a doctor at Open Heart and London's boyfriend.
 Jacob Neayem as Donny Mara, a gang member and stepcousin of Seth.
 Darrell Dennis at Det. Darryl Goodis, the main detective in the case of Richard Blake's disappearance.
 Donovan Brown as Drew, one of Dylan's old friends from her "bling ring".
 Sam Efford as Alex, one of Dylan's old friends from her "bling ring".

Episodes

References

External links 

2015 Canadian television series debuts
2015 Canadian television series endings
Canadian mystery television series
Television series about families
Television series about teenagers
Television series by DHX Media
Television shows filmed in Toronto
YTV (Canadian TV channel) original programming
2010s Canadian teen drama television series